Yazır, Korkuteli is a village in the District of Korkuteli, Antalya Province, Turkey.

Yazır was formerly thought to be the site of the ancient city of Isinda, which is now placed at the village of Kişla.

References

Villages in Korkuteli District